Włodzimierz Wojciech Ptak (2 November 1928 – 28 May 2019) was a Polish immunologist and microbiologist, professor of medical sciences, member of the Polish Academy of Sciences and the Polish Academy of Learning, professor and Vice-Rector at the Medical Academy in Kraków, later transformed into the Jagiellonian University Medical College, visiting professor at Yale University.

In his scientific work, he studied mainly the regulatory mechanisms of the immune response. Together with Richard K. Gershon, he co-authored the discovery of regulatory T cells. He published more than two hundred research papers, and was one of the most frequently cited Polish scientists in the field of biomedicine after 1965.

A graduate of the Medical Academy in Kraków, he was forcibly drafted into the Polish Army between 1952 and 1957. He obtained Ph.D. in 1962 at the Medical Academy in Szczecin. In 1967, he received British Council scholarship to the National Institute for Medical Research in London.

From 1974 until 1999, he was a visiting professor at Yale University, meanwhile standing as the Vice-Rector of the Medical Academy in Kraków (1978–1981) and a member of the Presidium of the International Union of Immunological Societies (1983–1986). He was a member of the Presidium (1978–1984) and a Chairman (1988–1990) of the Scientific Council by the Minister of Health and Welfare of Poland. Later, he was appointed a Secretary (1989–1995) and Vice-President (until 2008) of the Medical Faculty of the Polish Academy of Learning.

He received several awards and state distinctions, including the Knight's Cross (1977) and the Commander's Cross (1997) of the Polonia Restituta.

Life and work

1928–1952: Youth 

He was born in 1928 in Kraków as the son of Wojciech Ptak (1888–1946), an engineer and a graduate of the Lviv Polytechnic, and Maria Ptak (née Krawczyk; 1904–1986), an employee in kasa chorych, a public health insurance corporation. The father, as his son recalled, was a tough, demanding and strict man, fluent in French and German language.

His grandparents were Franciszek Ptak (1859–1936), an innkeeper, peasant movement activist and a member of the Diet of Galicia and Lodomeria, and Józef Krawczyk (1865–1942), a foreman in the cigarette factory “Cygar fabryka” at Dolnych Młynów Street in Kraków.

Włodzimierz had a younger sister, Wanda Ptak-Kollat (1930–1984), a master engineer in roads and bridges and a graduate of Kraków Polytechnic.

In 1936, Wojciech Ptak was offered a work in high office in the French-Polish railway company in Bydgoszcz, hence the Ptak family moved there. In 1939, after the outbreak of World War II, the Ptaks returned to Kraków, as Włodzimierz recalled: “We returned from a four-room apartment to a single room with a kitchen. We've lost everything. My father fell ill. He died of a heart attack just after the war, before my high school graduation.”

In his youth, Włodzimierz Ptak learned to play the violin. As a child, he attended the Bydgoszcz Conservatory of Music. As a teenager, in German-occupied Kraków, he was a student of Stanisław Syrewicz, the concert master of the Kraków Philharmonic. At the time, he attended the trade school at Brzozowa Street in Kraków, also taking secret Latin lessons from professor Pardiak.

From an early age, he was interested in biology and astronomy. He read a lot about nature. The book that he said attracted his attention particularly was The Natural History of One Protozoan by Jan Dembowski. As a boy, Włodzimierz kept himself a large collection of protozoa at home, and next to it a dog, a cat, a canary, a fish and a white mouse. Together with a friend of his, using glasses purchased at a local optical store, they constructed a simple telescope to observe the night sky.

From 1943, Ptak worked physically at the construction of the road from Dębniki to Prokocim, and later as a hand of a car mechanic in a workshop at Grzegórzecka Street in Kraków. He recalled: “During the war, when I was thirteen, I was searching through my grandfather's large library, and I came across a book that largely influenced the formation of my worldview. The Studies on Social Doctrines of Christianity by Yves Guyot contributed to the fact that I am irreligious.”

Ptak attended the Jan III Sobieski High School in Kraków, but due to a conflict with a mathematics teacher in the final year, he moved to the Henryk Sienkiewicz High School. There, he passed the matura exam in 1946.

Also in 1946, he enrolled to the medical studies at the Medical Academy in Kraków. There, among his teachers was Henryk Niewodniczański, who awarded Ptak with an excellent degree in exam in physics. At the end of the studies, Ptak's interests began to focus primarily on microbiology and bacteriology. He graduated in 1952.

During the studies, to support himself financially, he founded a music group with colleagues from different universities, and earned money by playing at seasonal parties and weddings.

1952–1970: In the army, Ph.D. 
In 1952, immediately after the graduation, Ptak was forcibly drafted into the Polish People's Army. Soon after, he was transferred to the Służba Polsce (Service to Poland; SP), a state paramilitary organization for young people. Ptak spent a total of five years in the army and SP.

He received an initial allocation in Jelenia Góra, where he worked on the production of viscose fibers. Then he was accepted by Ludwik Hirszfeld as a volunteer at the Institute of Immunology and Experimental Therapy of the Polish Academy of Sciences, but he remained there only for a few weeks. He was transferred to Katowice, where he worked as a medical controller of the SP units in Upper Silesia and Opole. Practically, this meant constant mobility and work in various facilities throughout the region.

In 1954, Ptak was relocated to Bydgoszcz, where he worked as a pediatrician for two months, though he had no previous experience in direct work with patients. Then, at his own request, he was transferred to Szczecin, where he wanted to continue his education.

He began to write requests for release from the army. In 1955, during a two-month sick leave, he worked at the Department of Microbiology at the Medical Academy in Kraków, where he conducted research together with Jan Bóbr. In 1957, he was dismissed from the service in the army and began work at the Department of Pathology at the Medical Academy in Szczecin. There, in 1961, he submitted his doctoral thesis and moved permanently to Kraków, where his mother lived.

He obtained Ph.D. in pathology in 1962 at the Medical Academy in Szczecin. He recalled: “Because of the army, I was already 34 years old. I wasted five years of life. At this age two of my first collaborators were already appointed associate professors”.

In 1967, Ptak left for a ten-month British Council scholarship to the National Institute for Medical Research in London.

1970–1999: Between Kraków and New Haven 

He passed his habilitation exam in the field of pathology in 1970. Julian Aleksandrowicz was one of the reviewers of his work. In 1976 Ptak was given the title of full professor.

Over the years, he held the position of Deputy Director of the Institute of Microbiology, Head of the Department of Experimental and Clinical Immunology of the Institute of Microbiology, and Head of the Department of Immunology of the Medical Academy in Kraków. Between 1978 and 1981, Ptak was the Vice-Rector of the Medical Academy in Kraków.

From 1974 until 1999, he was a visiting professor at the Department of Immunology, Department of Internal Medicine at Yale University. Altogether, he spent there more than seven years by submitting twenty-six visits. At Yale, his direct superior was Richard K. Gershon, with whom Ptak collaborated extensively and made friends.

Ptak believed that his frequent visits to the United States from a country of the Soviet Bloc, which Polish People's Republic then was, were enabled by the-then Rector of the Medical Academy in Kraków, Tadeusz Popiela: “It was not because the regime loved us that we left the country whenever we wanted. It was because Popiela often handed for us, and sent us on his own responsibility.”

Ptak stopped visiting Yale at the end of the 1990s, in spite of the repeated invitations. He explained it with his age: “In Kraków I can adjust my work time: three–four hours a day. There [at Yale] I worked fourteen–sixteen hours a day. That I cannot do any more.”

In 1986, he was elected a correspondent member of the Polish Academy of Sciences (PAN). In 1989, he was elected a member of the Polish Academy of Learning.

He was a member of the Committee for Immunology of the Polish Academy of Sciences, as well as a member of the Presidium of the International Union of Immunological Societies (1983–1986). In 1989, he was elected a member of the Polish Immunological Society, that later awarded him with an honorary membership. Ptak was also a member of the Presidium (1978–1984) and Chairman (1988–1990) of the Scientific Council by the Minister of Health and Welfare of Poland. Later, he was appointed the Secretary (1989–1995) and a Vice-President (until 2008) of the Medical Faculty of the Polish Academy of Learning.

In his scientific work, he studied mainly the regulatory mechanisms of the immune response. He published more than two hundred original research papers in international peer reviewed journals, and was one of the most frequently cited Polish scientists in the field of biomedicine after 1965.

Together with Richard K. Gershon, he was the co-author of the discovery of regulatory T cells. Beside, he participated in describing the regulatory functions of gamma delta T cells, and conducted research on the mechanisms of the early phase of cellular reactions, as well as the study of the regulatory functions of small interfering RNA.

1999–2019: Late work 

He was a member of the Editorial Board of the European Journal of Immunology (1985–2004), as well as a member of the Scientific Council of the Institute of Pharmacology of the Polish Academy of Sciences (1994–2018).

He authored a textbook "Podstawy immunologii" (Basics of Immunology) in Polish. First published in 1976, it was followed-up by a number of re-editions, co-authored by Maria Ptak and Marian Szczepanik (1987, 1999, 2009, 2017). Ptak was also active as an academic teacher. He was a promoter in ten doctoral dissertations.

He died in Kraków on 28 May 2019 at the age of 90, and was buried at the Rakowicki Cemetery on 3 June 2019, in the family grave.

Personal life 
Over the years, he made friends with artists and intellectuals, such as Zbigniew Cybulski, Adam Walaciński, Artur Maria Swinarski (in the 1950s), Franciszek Studnicki, Adam Macedoński (in the 1960s), Krzysztof Penderecki and Alexander Schenker (in the 1970s).

He was an atheist and defined his worldview as leftist. Among his hobbies were, among others, history, religion studies and philosophy. He was cast in a small role in a 2016 short film Hens (Kury). He was married three times, and had one daughter in the second marriage.

Selected papers

Awards and honors 
 Minister of Health of Poland Award, first degree (seven times, 1973–2009)
 Scientific Secretary of the Polish Academy of Sciences Award (1973, 1984)
 Knight's Cross of Polonia Restituta (1977)
 Jędrzej Śniadecki Award (1978)
 Alfred Jurzykowski Foundation Award (1981)
 Award of the Faculty of Medical Sciences of the Polish Academy of Sciences, first degree (1982)
 State Prize of the Polish People's Republic (1984)
 Meritorious Teacher of the Polish People's Republic Award (1984)
 “Gloria Medicinae” Medal awarded by the Polish Medical Association (1992)
 Prime Minister of Poland Award (1996)
 Commander's Cross of Polonia Restituta (1998)
 Minister of National Education of Poland Award (1999)
 Jagiellonian Laurel awarded by the Jagiellonian University (1999)
 Honoris Gratia Award awarded by the President of Kraków (2016)

Source

Notes

References

Bibliography 
 

Polish microbiologists
Polish immunologists
Members of the Polish Academy of Sciences
Members of the Polish Academy of Learning
Jagiellonian University alumni
Academic staff of Jagiellonian University
Yale School of Medicine faculty
1928 births
2019 deaths
Physicians from Kraków
Knights of the Order of Polonia Restituta
Commanders of the Order of Polonia Restituta
Polish atheists
Burials at Rakowicki Cemetery
Recipients of the State Award Badge (Poland)